Ana Maria de Rezende Versiani dos Anjos (born 19 March 1983) is a Brazilian film director and musician. She is the guitarist and keyboardist of the rock band CSS.

Music career
Rezende is responsible for the direction of CSS's first music video in Brazil, Off The Hook, filmed at Adriano Cintra's and Carolina Parra's house.
She is also the other half of the DJ-duo MeuKu along with fellow CSS bandmate Luiza Sá.

Personal life
Rezende lives in Los Angeles and is married to actress Katherine Moennig.

References 

Brazilian women guitarists
1983 births
Living people
Musicians from São Paulo
Women in electronic music
CSS (band) members
21st-century guitarists
Brazilian LGBT musicians
21st-century LGBT people
21st-century women guitarists